Bandon Hill may refer to:
Bandon Hill primary school
Bandon Hill Cemetery
Bandon Hill railway station